Abbey Road sessions or The Abbey Road Sessions may refer to:

 Abbey Road Sessions, a 1997 live solo album by Mike Peters
 Abbey Road Sessions, music recording sessions conducted at Abbey Road Studios
 The Abbey Road Sessions (DVD), a 2006 live DVD by Donavon Frankenreiter
 The Abbey Road Sessions (EP), a 1999 EP by Embrace
 The Abbey Road Sessions (Kylie Minogue album), 2012
 The Abbey Road Sessions (Ian Shaw album), 2011
 The Abbey Road Sessions/The Walk, a 2005 album by Steven Curtis Chapman

See also 
 Abbey Road (disambiguation)